Our Miss Fred is a 1972 British comedy film starring Danny La Rue, set during World War II. The film was also known by its video release titles Beyond the Call of Duty (Canada) and Operation: Fred (US). In the 1960s, La Rue was one of the highest paid entertainers in Britain, but this represents his only starring role in a feature film.

Plot
English Shakespearean actor Fred Wimbush is called up to serve in the British army during World War II. His skills result in his being asked to entertain the troops in France- and is asked to perform in drag. However, the Germans capture his position. Unless he continues his disguise in women's clothes, Fred fears he will be shot as a spy. He has to fend off both French locals and German troops. The double entendres and bullets fly as he attempts his escape in the company of the pupils from an English girls' finishing school.

On a country lane he encounters Miss Flodden and Miss Lockhart who run a nearby finishing school. They ask him to fix their car ("Agatha") and is introduced to their five pupils: four English and one American, who are hiding in a barn. They suggest that Fred loses his flamboyant dress and instead dresses as a teacher.

They have an escaped airman (Smallpiece) hidden in a shed. Fred reveals his true identity to him. Fred finds a Nazi uniform to disguise Smallpiece.

Fred drives around the French countryside with the girls encountering the Germans as he goes.

They head for an airfield and get in pretending to be a group of girls from the local brothel. Although they fail to catch a plane they attach "Agatha" to a blimp and float off to safety.

However, in the final scene Fred is entertaining a group of Germans, in drag, singing "Hitler Has Only Got One Ball".

Sample gag
'Given his experience as a (Shakespearean) actor, (Fred) ends up...working as an entertainer for the troops. And playing all the female parts. He's not entirely happy... "Look at me, dressed like a bird," he grumbles. "They used to come from miles away to see my Titus Andronicus."

Cast
Danny La Rue - Fred Wimbush
Alfred Marks - General Brincker
Lance Percival - Squadron Leader Smallpiece
Lally Bowers - Miss Flodden
Frances de la Tour - Miss Lockhart
Walter Gotell - Schmidt
Kristin Hatfield - Hilary
Jenny Twigge - Judith
Vanessa Furse - Prunella
Seretta Wilson - Elvira
Sophie Batchelor - Emma
John Barrard - Patron
Nancy Nevinson - Patron's Wife
Cyril Shaps - Doctor	 
Frank Thornton - British Colonel
André Maranne - French Resistance Fighter
Barrie Gosney - Bertie
David Ellen - Bobby
Toni Palmer - Vendeuse
Jennifer Croxton - Jeanette
Anthony Sagar - R.S.M.
Noel Coleman - Senior RAF officer
Peter Greenwell - M.C.
Gertan Klauber - German Officer

Production
The film was constructed specifically as a vehicle for La Rue. Filming took place in June 1972.

Reception

Box office
The film was a box office disappointment.

Critical reception
In "The Spinning image", Graeme Clark called the film, "a goodnatured comedy which, while you can see why La Rue's prospects in cinema might have been limited, also proved he was no dead loss in front of the camera either." In the Radio Times, David McGillivray wrote, "Danny La Rue, Britain's most popular female impersonator during the 1970's, seems terribly constricted in his one major film, an old-fashioned wartime comedy written by distinguished playwright Hugh Leonard."

Psychotic Cinema wrote, "this is a fun movie with plenty of sexual innuendo jokes and a rousing rendition of the popular song Hitler Has Only Got One Ball." Movies About Girls wrote of La Rue, "he actually comes across remarkably well on screen...It’s all terrifically entertaining... La Rue can’t hide the fact that he’s loving every minute of it. You wouldn’t want him to either, because each and every smirk and grin means you can’t help but enjoy yourself along with him."

References

External links

Our Miss Fred at BFI

1972 LGBT-related films
1970s historical comedy films
1972 films
British historical comedy films
Films directed by Bob Kellett
British World War II films
Cross-dressing in British films
EMI Films films
Films about actors
Films set in France
Films with screenplays by Hugh Leonard
Films with screenplays by Terence Feely
Films with screenplays by Ted Willis, Baron Willis
Films produced by Josephine Douglas
Films scored by Peter Greenwell
1970s English-language films
1970s British films